Vice Admiral Ajay Kochhar, AVSM, NM is a serving Flag officer in the Indian Navy. He currently serves as the Commandant of the National Defence Academy. He last served as the  Project Director (Operations and Training) in the ATV Project Headquarters. He earlier served as the Flag Officer Commanding Western Fleet and prior to that was the third commanding officer of the aircraft carrier INS Vikramaditya.

Naval career 
Kochhar was commissioned into the Indian Navy on 1 July 1988. He is a specialist in Gunnery and Missile Warfare. He has commanded five warships of the Indian Navy. On 29 June 2013, as the commissioning commanding officer of the Talwar-class stealth guided missile frigate , he commissioned the ship in Kaliningrad, Russia.

On 20 July 2017, Kochhar took command of the flagship of the Indian Navy, the aircraft carrier  as its third commanding officer.

Flag rank
On promotion to Flag Rank, Kochhar took over as the Assistant Controller Carrier Project (ACCP) at Naval headquarters. He then served as the Assistant Controller Warship Production & Acquisition (ACWP&A). As the ACCP, he managed the construction of the indigenous aircraft carrier. In his role as ACWP&A, he oversaw all aspects related to construction and acquisition of warships for the Navy both from Indian as well as foreign shipyards.

Kochhar took command of the Western Fleet on 24 February 2021 as the Flag Officer Commanding Western Fleet from Rear Admiral Krishna Swaminathan. For his command of the Western fleet, he was awarded the Ati Vishisht Seva Medal on 26 January 2022.

On 1 April 2022, Kochhar took over as the Commandant of the National Defence Academy from Air Marshal Sanjeev Kapoor.

Awards and decorations

See also
 Flag Officer Commanding Western Fleet
 Western Fleet
 INS Vikramaditya

References 

Indian Navy admirals
Living people
Flag Officers Commanding Western Fleet
Year of birth missing (living people)
Recipients of the Ati Vishisht Seva Medal
Recipients of the Nau Sena Medal
Defence Services Staff College alumni
Naval War College, Goa alumni
Graduates of the Royal College of Defence Studies
Commandants of the National Defence Academy